Daniel Tkaczuk (born June 10, 1979) is a Canadian ice hockey coach and former centre who played 19 games in the National Hockey League for the Calgary Flames. He is currently an assistant coach for the Springfield Thunderbirds of the American Hockey League.

Playing career
Tkaczuk was born in Toronto, Ontario. As a youth, he played in the 1993 Quebec International Pee-Wee Hockey Tournament with Toronto Marlboros minor ice hockey team.

He was selected sixth overall in the 1997 NHL Entry Draft by the Calgary Flames. He represented Canada at the 1999 World Junior Ice Hockey Championships, where he won a silver medal and led the team in scoring. Tkaczuk was named to the American Hockey League's All-Rookie Team the following season. He played in the National Hockey League for the Calgary Flames during the 2001–02 campaign, but suffered a severe concussion in a game against the Arizona Coyotes during his 19th game. He returned to the minors and never saw NHL action again.

Tkaczuk left the Flames system at the end of 2000–01 after winning the Calder Cup when traded along with Fred Brathwaite, Sergei Varlamov, and a 2001 ninth-round pick to the St. Louis Blues for goaltender Roman Turek on June 23, 2001. He would then play two more years in the AHL for the Worcester IceCats and after being released by the St. Louis Blues, for the Bridgeport Sound Tigers.

Unhappy with his shaky status in the minors, he tried his luck in Europe, spending the 2003–04 season with Lukko of Finland's major league, the SM-liiga, where his numbers were respectable, but not impressive enough to earn him a significant profile in Finland.

Tkaczuk then turned to Milan, the highest paying club in the Italian league, where he enjoyed considerable success, maintaining his preeminence even during the 2004–5 season, when the squad was strengthened by the arrival of NHL players during the NHL lockout. He led Milan in goals (23), assists (33) and points (56) during the regular season and playoffs, good enough for third place overall in Serie A scoring. Thanks to those solid numbers, Tkaczuk was one of three Milan players, along with defenceman Marc Savard and veteran forward Ryan Savoia, named to Team Canada's roster for the 2004 Loto Cup in Slovakia. Milan went on to win the national title, their fourth in a row, defeating Cortina in the finals.

In the late summer of 2005, Tkaczuk held talks with Krefeld Pinguine of the Deutsche Eishockey Liga (DEL), Grand Rapids Griffins of the American Hockey League, and Lada Togliatti of the Russian Super League before eventually returning to Milan.

In 2006, Tkaczuk signed for ERC Ingolstadt of the DEL. In 2007, he moved to EV Duisburg Die Füchse and played there until the completion of the 2008–09 season. Tkaczuk was second in goals during the 2007–08 season (17).

After six years abroad, Tkaczuk returned to North America and signed with the Charlotte Checkers of the ECHL on November 13, 2009. He would later be loaned to the Rochester Americans on December 7, 2009. On January 6, 2010, the Hartford Wolf Pack signed Tkaczuk to a professional tryout (PTO) contract. Tkaczuk finished the season with 45 points in 46 games for the Checkers.

In the following season, Tkaczuk signed a one-year contract with the EC TREND-Dornbirn of the second-tier Austrian National League on September 16, 2010 After scoring 33 points in 26 games with Trend, Tkaczuk signed for the Nottingham Panthers of the Elite Ice Hockey League (EIHL) in the United Kingdom, on January 19, 2011.

Coaching career
After retiring, he became an assistant coach with the Owen Sound Attack and the Kitchener Rangers of the OHL. He then became assistant coach of the American Hockey League's Chicago Wolves in 2016 before spending the 2017–18 season as skills coach with the St. Louis Blues. In 2018, he became an assistant coach for the Blues' AHL affiliate the San Antonio Rampage.

Personal
Tkaczuk is the president of iHockeyTrainer.com, an online hockey school for training and skill development. He is also a columnist for The Hockey News, often providing insight from a player's perspective  He is married and has two young boys, Weylan and Sawyer Tkaczuk.

Career statistics

Regular season and playoffs

International

References

External links

1979 births
Living people
Barrie Colts players
Bridgeport Sound Tigers players
Calgary Flames draft picks
Calgary Flames players
Canadian ice hockey centres
Charlotte Checkers (1993–2010) players
Dornbirn Bulldogs players
ERC Ingolstadt players
Füchse Duisburg players
Hartford Wolf Pack players
Lukko players
National Hockey League first-round draft picks
Nottingham Panthers players
Rochester Americans players
Saint John Flames players
Ice hockey people from Toronto
Syracuse Crunch players
Worcester IceCats players
Canadian expatriate ice hockey players in England
Canadian expatriate ice hockey players in Finland
Canadian expatriate ice hockey players in Germany